is a religious term meaning the current life someone is living in right now.

Many religions provide means to gain  or benefits in the present life in addition to in other lives.

Shinto 

In Shinto, the word "present world" is historically read as "Utsushiro", meaning this world or the real world in which people live. In contrast, there is the land of God as the so-called heaven, paradise, and the land of Death or Yomi as the so-called hell, which is called Tokoyo Yomi as the land of the dead, or Yomi as the land of the dead.

In the Himorogi and Panza beliefs, which are said to be the beginning of Ko-Shintō, huge trees and stones in forests, mountains, and rocks are said to be Yorishiro of the gods, and at the same time, Iwakura means "border between the everlasting world and the present world". In Shrine Shinto as well, the Chinju no Mori and the broad-leaved evergreen trees planted in them represent the Shinto realm and at the same time are boundaries, which prevent the events of the everlasting world and the present world from coming and going easily. It is also a warding, which prevents the events of the everlasting world and the present world from coming and going easily.

Worldly benefits in Shinto 
Since ancient times, people have prayed to the guardian deities of the local community, such as the Ujigami or Chinjujin, for rain, sun, insects, and disease, as part of the collective will of the community members of the village or other clans. Even today, this traditional culture has taken root in "festivals. Nowadays, in order to respond to the heartfelt wishes of individuals, Shinto priests and miko (priestesses and priestesses of Shinto shrines) perform a ritual prayer and Kagura-mai (dance performance) in front of the gods, and the prayers are obtained through the offering of a tamagushi (sacred skewer) by the person who prays. The types of personal wishes are classified into the following categories: disease remedies (for oneself and one's family), family safety, prosperous business, and relief from hardships in life.。

In general, the position of worldly benefits in religion tends to be downplayed, but in Japan, they are recognized as inseparable from the other benefits of religion.

Buddhism 
The present life is one of the "" in Buddhism,  and next life. Apart from the temporal back and forth, Purification has the concept of "Impure Land and Pure Land". The word "Impure land" means "defiled world" and corresponds to the present world, and Pure land to the Everlasting world.

In the Vajra Prajnaparamita Sutra, it is written, "All  dharma is like a dream and a shadow of a bubble," suggesting that the Buddhists understood this world as a dream and a bubble, something fleeting. Thus, Buddhism had a negative view of this world.

Worldly benefits in Buddhism 

Then, in response to the people's desire to pray for benefits in order to recover when calamities struck and life failed, the Shingon and Tendai Esoteric Buddhism that flourished from the late antiquity to the Middle Ages were introduced, such as the 

By the time of the  period, as in the Hōnen, " If one's illness is cured and one's life is prolonged by praying, then where would one die?"

Christianity 

Islam 

In Islam,  refers to the temporal world and its earthly concerns and possessions, as opposed to the hereafter (ʾākhirah). In the Qur'an, dunyā and ākhira are sometimes used dichotomously, other times complementarily. Islam does not a priori dismiss the world as "evil". Instead, this world is defined as "the field of ākhira" and the place of examination.

In literature 
Edogawa Ranpo is known to have often written on colored paper, "this world is a dream, and the dream of the night is the true thing".。

See also 

 Dunya
 Yomotsu Hirasaka
 Everlasting world
 現代 (disambiguation)

References

Literature 

 小口偉一ほか『宗教学辞典』東京大学出版会 1973年
 

Religious philosophical concepts
Buddhist cosmology
Buddhist terminology
Pages with unreviewed translations
Reincarnation
Shinto and society